Stefano Perugini (born 10 September 1974, in Viterbo) is a former Grand Prix motorcycle road racer from Italy. His best season was in 2003 when he won two Grand Prix races and finished the season in fourth place in the 125cc world championship. He won five Grand Prix races during his career.

Career statistics

Grand Prix motorcycle racing

Races by year 

(key) (Races in bold indicate pole position; races in italics indicate fastest lap)

References 

1974 births
Sportspeople from the Province of Viterbo
Italian motorcycle racers
125cc World Championship riders
250cc World Championship riders
Living people